

This is a list of the National Register of Historic Places listings in Adams County, Pennsylvania.

This is intended to be a complete list of the properties and districts on the National Register of Historic Places in Adams County, Pennsylvania, United States.  The locations of National Register properties and districts for which the latitude and longitude coordinates are included below, may be seen in a map.

There are 35 properties and districts listed on the National Register in the county. One site is further designated as a National Historic Site and another is designated as a National Military Park.  Another property was once listed but has been removed.

Current listings

|}

Former listings

|}

See also 

 List of Pennsylvania state historical markers in Adams County

References 

 
 
Adams County